Ocotea is a genus of flowering plants belonging to the family Lauraceae. Many are evergreen trees with lauroid leaves.

There are over 520 species currently accepted within the genus, distributed mostly in tropical and subtropical areas of the Americas (around 300 species) including the Caribbean and West Indies, but also with some species in Africa, Madagascar and the Mascarene Islands. One species (O. foetens) is native to the Macaronesia (in Canary Islands and Madeira). The genus is suspected to be paraphyletic.

Description

They are trees or shrubs, occasionally with adventitious roots (O. hartshorniana, O. insularis). Leaves simple, alternate, rarely opposite or whorled.  The leaves are lauroid, they are commonly dark green glossy with sometimes brown on the underside and fragrant oil cells.

The African and Madagascan species all have bisexual flowers (possessing both male and female parts), whereas many of the American species have flowers that are unisexual (either male or female).
The apetalous flowers are in small panicles.

The fruits are globose or oblong berries, 3–5 cm in length, hard and fleshy and at the junction of the peduncle part with the fruit covered by a cup-shaped, occasionally flat, cupule, giving them an appearance similar to an acorn. The fruit is dark green, gradually darkening with maturity. The cupule at the base of the berry, can be more brightly colored. The fruit has a single seed wrapped in a hard coat and can be slightly lignified.

Names
The genus has no standard common name. Names often refer to the aroma of the wood, which can be strong and not always pleasant. Sweetwood is usually applied only to this genus, although many names are also applied to this genus and other genera:
Stinkwood can refer to several unrelated trees that have bad-smelling wood. Ocotea bullata is called black stinkwood or true stinkwood, and Ocotea foetens is also called stinkwood.
Camphorwood is usually Cinnamomum camphora a close relative of Ocotea species.
Rosewood (Peruvian rosewood, O. cernua) is normally Dalbergia or related members of the family Fabaceae.

The common names of some species refer to their similarity to other Lauraceae such as Sassafras (Brazilian sassafras: O. odorifera) or Laurus (Cape laurel: O. bullata, Sword laurel: O. floribunda, Guaika laurel: O. puberula, etc.).

Distribution and habitat

Most species of Ocotea are distributed across the tropical Americas, from Mexico to Northern Argentina including the West Indies. Species are also found in eastern Africa from South Africa to Ethiopia, in Gabon and Republic of the Congo in Central Africa, and on Madagascar and the Mascarene Islands. One species, Ocotea foetens, is native to the Canary Islands and Madeira in the North Atlantic.

Ocotea species are distributed in subtropical and tropical regions, often at higher elevations. They are characteristic plants of many tropical and subtropical montane forests such as the Araucaria moist forests, Yungas, and Talamancan montane forests in the Americas, Afromontane forests including the Knysna-Amatole montane forests in Africa, and Laurisilva in the Macaronesian islands. In Madagascar and Brazil they also occur in lowland forests.

Ecology
Most relatively small fruit species are of great environmental importance because they are the food of many endemic birds and mammals, especially in Islands, and premontane and montane forests. The leaves of Ocotea species are the food source for the caterpillars of several species of endemic Lepidoptera, including several species of Memphis. Some Memphis caterpillars feed solely on the leaves of one species of Ocotea; for example M. mora feeds only on O. cernua, and M. boisduvali feeds only on O. veraguensis

Seed distribution of some Ocotea species is performed by frugivorous birds such as toucans, the three-wattled bellbird (family Cotingidae), quetzal and Cape parrot. Ocotea fruit is also consumed by several Columbiformes such as Columba trocaz, Delegorgue's pigeon, Bolle's pigeon (Columba bollii), African wood pigeon, and American doves.

Most of the African tree species are ancient paleoendemic species, which in ancient times were widely distributed on the continent. This is not the case in the Americas: 89 species have been collected in Venezuela alone.

Species of Ocotea can be attacked by various rot-inducing root pathogens, including Loweporus inflexibilis, Phellinus apiahynus and Phytophthora cinnamomi.

Some Ocotea species are used as nesting sites by ants, which may live in leaf pockets or in hollowed-out stems. The ants patrol their host plants more frequently in response to disturbance or to the appearance of insect pests such as grasshoppers.

Uses

Ocotea produce essential oils, which are rich in camphor and safrole. East African camphorwood (O. usambarensis), Peruvian rosewood (O. cernua) and Brazilian sassafras (O. odorifera) are traded internationally.

Dried fruit cupules of ishpingo (O. quixos) are used in Ecuador to flavor beverages, such as colada morada.

Some fast growing Ocotea tree species are harvested commercially for timber. These include O. puberula, O. bullata (black or true stinkwood) and O. usambarensis. The timber is valued for its resistance to fungal decay.

O. odorifera (Brazilian sassafras) and O. kuhlmanni are frequently used as honey plants.

Selected species

The following are some of the species of Ocotea. Distinguishing Ocotea species from Nectandra and other close relatives is problematic. Povedadaphne may be better placed in Ocotea.

 Ocotea aciphylla
 Ocotea acutifolia (Nees) Mez
 Ocotea albida
 Ocotea albopunctulata
 Ocotea amazonica
 Ocotea amplifolia
 Ocotea arnottiana
 Ocotea atirrensis
 Ocotea bangii
 Ocotea basicordatifolia
 Ocotea benthamiana
 Ocotea bofo
 Ocotea bullata – black stinkwood, true stinkwood
 Ocotea camphoromoea
 Ocotea catharinensis
 Ocotea cernua – Peruvian rosewood
 Ocotea clarkei
 Ocotea corymbosa Mez
 Ocotea cuneifolia
 Ocotea cymbarum (often included in O. odorifera)
 Ocotea diospyrifolia (Meisn.) Mez
 Ocotea dispersa (Nees) Mez
 Ocotea divaricata (Nees) Mez
 Ocotea domatiata Mez
 Ocotea fasciculata (Nees) Mez
 Ocotea floribunda
 Ocotea foeniculacea – black sweetwood
 Ocotea foetens – "til", "tilo"
 Ocotea gabonensis
 Ocotea glaucosericea
 Ocotea glaziovii Mez
 Ocotea gracilis
 Ocotea guianensis
 Ocotea harrisii
 Ocotea heterochroma
 Ocotea indecora (Schott) Mez
 Ocotea insularis
 Ocotea illustris
 Ocotea infrafoveolata
 Ocotea jelskii
 Ocotea jorge-escobarii
 Ocotea kenyensis
 Ocotea lancifolia
 Ocotea lancilimba
 Ocotea langsdorffii
 Ocotea leucoxylon – loblolly sweetwood
 Ocotea mandonii
 Ocotea marmellensis
 Ocotea matogrossensis
 Ocotea megaphylla
 Ocotea minarum Mart. ex Nees
 Ocotea monzonensis
 Ocotea moschata – nemoca
 Ocotea nemodaphne – laurel sassafras
 Ocotea notata (Nees) Mez
 Ocotea oblonga
 Ocotea obtusata
 Ocotea odorifera – Brazilian sassafras
 Ocotea oocarpa
 Ocotea otuzcensis
 Ocotea pachypoda
 Ocotea pauciflora
 Ocotea porosa
 Ocotea porphyria
 Ocotea portoricensis
 Ocotea prunifolia
 Ocotea puberula
 Ocotea pulchra Vattimo-Gil
 Ocotea quixos – ishpingo
 Ocotea raimondii
 Ocotea rivularis
 Ocotea robertsoniae
 Ocotea rotundata
 Ocotea rubrinervis
 Ocotea rugosa
 Ocotea sericea
 Ocotea silvestris Vattimo-Gil
 Ocotea smithiana
 Ocotea spathulata
 Ocotea spectabilis
 Ocotea spixiana (Nees) Mez
 Ocotea staminoides
 Ocotea tabacifolia (Meisn.) Rohwer
 Ocotea teleiandra (Meisn.) Mez
 Ocotea urbaniana Mez
 Ocotea usambarensis – East African camphorwood
 Ocotea uxpanapana
 Ocotea vaccinioides Meisn.
 Ocotea velloziana
 Ocotea velutina Mart.
 Ocotea viridiflora
 Ocotea wrightii – Wright's laurel canelon

Formerly placed here
 Chlorocardium rodiei (bibiru, "greenheart"), as O. rodiei
 Nectandra coriacea ("lancewood"), as O. catesbyana, O. coriacea
 Sextonia rubra, as O. rubra

Fossil record
†Ocotea hradekensis from the early Miocene, has been described from fragmentary fossil leaf compressions that have been found in the Kristina Mine at Hrádek nad Nisou in North Bohemia, the Czech Republic. O. foetens from the Canary Islands is its nearest living relative. Fossil †Ocotea heerii leaf impressions of Messinian age (ca. 5.7 Ma) have been uncovered in Monte Tondo, northern Apennines, Italy.

References

External links

 
Lauraceae genera
Neotropical realm flora
Afrotropical realm flora